Besh may refer to:
Besh, Albania, a village in Tirana County, Albania
Besh, Iran, a village in Mazandaran Province, Iran
Besh o droM, Hungarian music group
Besh-Aryk, village in the Jalal-Abad Province of Kyrgyzstan
John Besh, the owner and executive chef at Restaurant August in New Orleans, Louisiana
, dance melodies composed in Azerbaijan

See also
Beshbarmak, main national dish in Kyrgyzstan and Bashkiria
Beşdəli (disambiguation), multiple places in Azerbaijan
Beshtau, isolated five-domed igneous mountain near Pyatigorsk in the northern Caucasus